Lkhagvasürengiin Otgonbaatar (born 20 January 1993) is a Mongolian judoka. He represented his country at the 2016 Summer Olympics.
He participated at the 2018 World Judo Championships, winning a medal.

References

External links
 
 

1993 births
Living people
Mongolian male judoka
Judoka at the 2016 Summer Olympics
Olympic judoka of Mongolia
Asian Games medalists in judo
Judoka at the 2014 Asian Games
Judoka at the 2018 Asian Games
Asian Games bronze medalists for Mongolia
Medalists at the 2014 Asian Games
Medalists at the 2018 Asian Games
People from Battsengel
Judoka at the 2020 Summer Olympics
20th-century Mongolian people
21st-century Mongolian people